The Green Lantern Saloon is a historic commercial building and former restaurant and bar located in Nyssa, Oregon, United States.

The saloon was added to the National Register of Historic Places in 1996.

See also
National Register of Historic Places listings in Malheur County, Oregon

References

External links

, National Register of Historic Places cover documentation

1906 establishments in Oregon
Buildings and structures completed in 1906
Buildings and structures in Malheur County, Oregon
National Register of Historic Places in Malheur County, Oregon
Nyssa, Oregon
Vernacular architecture in Oregon